In Persian and Zoroastrian legends, the mighty Gaokerena was a mythic Haoma plant that had healing properties when eaten and gave immortality to the resurrected bodies of the dead. The juice from its fruit gave the elixir of immortality. The name Gaokerena means "ox horn" or "cow ear".

Evil naturally tried to destroy this life-giving tree and formed a lizard or frog to attack it, but it was protected by the ten Kara fish and a donkey with nine mouths and six eyes.

At the resurrection, those who drink of the life-giving juice of this plant will obtain perfect welfare, including deathlessness.

It bears similarity to the Biblical and Islamic Tree of Life.

Notes 

Persian mythology